The 2017 Stan Wawrinka season started with the 2017 Brisbane International and ended with a first round loss at Wimbledon.

Year summary

Australian Open and early hard court season

Brisbane International
Wawrinka opened his season for the first time in his career in Brisbane after eight consecutive years in Chennai. After a bye in the first round he beat Viktor Troicki. In the quarter finals, Wawrinka beat Kyle Edmund in three sets. In the semifinal the Swiss player was defeated by Kei Nishikori.

Australian Open
Wawrinka entered the first Grand Slam of the year as the fourth seed. In the first round he rescues, only to be defeated by Martin Klizan. Wawrinka lost the first set 4–6, but the Swiss won the following two sets by 6–4, 7–5. When the match seemed to be in the Stan's hands Klizan recovered and he broke Wawrinka in the seventh game of the fourth set. In the final set Wawrinka was under a break with the score of 2–4. Wawrinka retrieved again and at the end he won the set and the match.
In the following rounds the Swiss faced in order Steve Johnson, Viktor Troicki and Andreas Seppi. In these three matches Wawrinka lost only one set against the Serbian tennis player and he was particularly in trouble with Seppi who was defeated in three tie-breaks by the Swiss. In the quarter finals Wawrinka's opponent was the French Jo-Wilfried Tsonga. Wawrinka got rid of Tsonga quickly in three sets. In the semifinal Wawrinka faced his compatriot Roger Federer and was beaten in five sets.

Dubai Open
Wawrinka is the defending champion in Dubai. The Swiss player lost in the first round against Damir Džumhur in two sets, despite the Wawrinka's advantage of one break in the first set.

Indian Wells Masters
Wawrinka entered the final and ended up losing to Roger Federer in two close sets.

Clay court season and French Open

Geneva Open
Stan Wawrinka retained his title at Geneva Open

French Open
At the French Open Wawrinka, the 2015 champion, reached the final round but lost to Rafael Nadal 6–2, 6–3, 6–1. Nadal won a record 10th Roland Garros title on his favoured clay surface, his first Grand Slam victory since the 2014 French Open.

All matches
This table chronicles all the matches of Stan Wawrinka in 2017, including walkovers (W/O) which the ATP does not count as wins. They are marked ND for non-decision or no decision.

Singles matches

Doubles matches

Exhibition matches

Tournament schedule

Singles

Yearly records

Head-to-head matchups
Stan Wawrinka had a  match win–loss record in the 2017 season. The following list is ordered by number of wins:

 Viktor Troicki 2–0
 Pablo Carreño Busta 1–0
 Marin Čilić 1–0
 Alexandr Dolgopolov 1–0
 Kyle Edmund 1–0
 Fabio Fognini 1–0
 Malek Jaziri 1–0
 Steve Johnson 1–0
 Martin Kližan 1–0
 Philipp Kohlschreiber 1–0
 Jozef Kovalík 1–0
 Andrey Kuznetsov 1–0
 Paolo Lorenzi 1–0
 Gael Monfils 1–0
 Andy Murray 1–0
 Yoshihito Nishioka 1–0
 Sam Querrey 1–0
 Andreas Seppi 1–0
 Rogério Dutra Silva 1–0
 Dominic Thiem 1–0
 Jo-Wilfried Tsonga 1–0
 Jiří Veselý 1–0
 Horacio Zeballos 1–0
 Mischa Zverev 1–0
 Benoît Paire 1–1
 Pablo Cuevas 0–1
 Damir Džumhur 0–1
 John Isner 0–1
 Feliciano López 0–1
 Daniil Medvedev 0–1
 Rafael Nadal 0–1
 Kei Nishikori 0–1
 Alexander Zverev 0–1
 Roger Federer 0–2

Finals

Singles: 3 (1–2)

Earnings
Bold font denotes tournament win

 Figures in United States dollars (USD) unless noted.

See also
 2017 ATP World Tour
 2017 Roger Federer tennis season
 2017 Rafael Nadal tennis season
 2017 Novak Djokovic tennis season
 2017 Andy Murray tennis season

References

External links
2017 ATP Tour

Wawrinka
Wawrinka
2017 in Swiss tennis
2017 in Swiss sport